"Fire on Babylon" is a 1994 song by Irish singer Sinéad O'Connor, released as the second single from her fourth album, Universal Mother (1994). Co-written and produced by her with John Reynolds and English musician, composer and record producer Tim Simenon, it also features a sample from "Dr. Jekyll" by Miles Davis. It peaked at number four in Poland, and was a top 30 hit in New Zealand and a top 40 hit in the Netherlands. But did not chart in the UK. Reynolds told that the energy possessed by O'Connor's vocals on the track was almost impossible to contain, but they managed to trap it on tape somehow. He was nominated to the Qs Producer of the Year award for the Universal Mother album. O'Connor performed the song in several TV-shows, like Late Show with David Letterman and Later... with Jools Holland. Its accompanying music video was directed by French director Michel Gondry

Chart performance
The song charted in Europe, Australia and New Zealand. A huge hit in Poland, it peaked at number four there. In the Netherlands, its first entry on the Single Top 100 was at number 45 in September 1994. It peaked at number 36 and spent four weeks at the chart with number 46 as the last position in October. The song didn't reach the Dutch Top 40, but peaked at number two on the Tipparade. In Belgium, "Fire on Babylon" only charted in Flanders, peaking at number 43 in its first week on the Ultratop chart. The following week, it dropped down to number 49 before leaving the chart, with a total of two weeks on it. 

In New Zealand, the song reached the top 30, peaking at number 29 in October 1994. It first time entered that chart at number 45, and the last entry was at number 36. In Australia, the song was a top 60 hit on the ARIA Charts, peaking at number 57 in November 1994.

Critical reception
Peter Galvin from The Advocate wrote that on the song, O'Connor "launches into a hip hop-inflected antimother diatribe". Larry Flick from Billboard said the singer "will continue to mend political fences with this genius, if not emotionally harrowing, slice of funk-rock". He stated that her voice "has never been more captivating, swerving around a jagged drum and restrained but spikey guitars. A wafting Hugel horn gives the track a surprisingly haunting context. Alternative programmers should get on this immediately." Kelly Collins from Columbia Daily Spectator felt that it "displays O'Connor's fiery side, and the slick programming adds a powerful element to the number." Evelyn McDonnell from Entertainment Weekly found that she "cleverly probes the contradiction between mother-worshiping and mother-blaming", adding that "Fire on Babylon" has "flashes of passion". Michael R. Smith from The Daily Vault described it as an "angry statement song". Diffuser ranked it number five in their list of "10 Best Sinead O'Connor Songs" in 2013, calling it a "reggae-inspired groove". They added further that "the vocal is haunting, and coupled with the subject matter, it's chill inducing." 

Chuck Campbell from Knoxville News Sentinel said "the intensity of her arching vocals underscores the ominous bass loop" of "Fire on Babylon". A reviewer from Lennox Herald complimented it as "very excellent". Neil Spencer from The Observer remarked "the vengeful neo-reggae". Orla Swift from Record-Journal declared it as a "fierce rocker". Joy Press from Spin wrote that it's "a harrowing, almost apocalyptic opener, O'Connor's voice stretched shrilly over a menacing bass as she bears witness to her own nightmares. Yet in the midst of this scorched war zone, the song momentarily ebbs into a dizzy, melodic oasis." Larry Nager from The Telegraph noted that it's the "loudest" song on Universal Mother, adding that it "roars and O'Connor sings ambiguously about the biblical whore of Babylon, seemingly meaning the British Empire." LaTasha Natasha Diggs for Vibe said that here, the singer's "trademark wails and whines flow."

Music video
The accompanying music video for "Fire on Babylon" was directed by French director Michel Gondry, who also directed the videos for "Human Behaviour" for Björk and "Protection" for Massive Attack. It was made as a sombre and unsettling vision of O'Connor's childhood and was released on August 15. The video was nominated for a Grammy Award for Best Short Form Music Video in 1995.

Track listing
 Europe, CD single (1994)
"Fire on Babylon" – 5:12
"I Believe in You" – 5:41
"House of the Rising Sun" – 5:09
"Streets of London" – 4:10

Charts

References

1994 singles
1994 songs
Sinéad O'Connor songs
Songs written by Sinéad O'Connor
Songs written by John Reynolds (musician)
Song recordings produced by John Reynolds
Song recordings produced by Bomb the Bass
Music videos directed by Michel Gondry